Little Red Riding Hood is an album by American roots music band Lost Dogs.  It was released on WAL Records in 1993.

Track listing
 "No Ship Coming In" (Taylor)  (3:56)
 "Imagine That" (Words by Taylor/Daugherty, Music by Daugherty)  (4:03)
 "You Satisfy" (Roe)  (4:06)
 "Bad Indigestion" (Taylor)  (3:25)
 "Dunce Cap" (Words by Eugene/Taylor, Music by Eugene/Daugherty)  (3:47)
 "Jesus Loves You, Brian Wilson" (Roe)  (3:16)
 "Precious Memories" (Traditional)  (3:10)
 "Rocky Mountain Mines" (Taylor)  (4:11)
 "Jimmy" (Eugene)  (2:49)
 "Eleanor, It's Raining Now" (Taylor)  (6:16)
 "Free At Last" (Words by the Lost Dogs, Music by Roe)  (4:58)
 "Red, White and Blue" (Taylor)  (2:44)
 "I'm A Loser" (John Lennon/Paul McCartney)  (2:51)
 "No Room For Us" (Taylor)  (4:11)
 "Pray Where You Are" (Words by the Lost Dogs, Music by Taylor)  (3:46)
 On the Good Ship Lollipop (Richard A. Whiting/Sidney Clare) (1:06) (hidden track)

Personnel
Derri Daugherty — guitars, bass, and vocals
Gene Eugene — guitars, piano, bass, and vocals
Mike Roe — guitars, bass, harmonica, and vocals
Terry Scott Taylor — guitars and vocals

Additional musicians
Jerry Chamberlain — background vocals on "No Ship Coming In" and "Rocky Mountain Mines"
Tim Chandler — bass on "Dunce Cap", "Eleanor, It's Raining Now" and "Pray Where You Are". Also on "Imagine That" (uncredited)

Production notes
 Produced by Terry Scott Taylor, Gene Eugene, Derri Daugherty and Mike Roe.
 Executive Producers: Ojo Taylor and Gene Eugene.
 Recorded the Dogs way at The Green Room, Huntington Beach by Gene Eugene with David Hackbarth and Mark Rodriguez and the Dogs.
 Mixed at Mixing Lab, Garden Grove.
 Produced for the WAL by Brainstorm Productions.
 Art Direction, Design and Photography by Anna Cardenas.
 Additional Layout and Production by Ed McTaggart.

References

Lost Dogs albums
1993 albums